Pycnanthemum incanum, with the common name hoary mountainmint, "mountain mint", wild basil or hoary basil, is a herbaceous perennial in the mint family.

Distribution
The plant is widespread across Eastern United States and into Ontario, Canada.  It prefers rocky, gravelly or sandy soil, and typically grows in woods, thickets, fields, and hills.

Conservation
It is listed as an endangered species in Vermont and New Hampshire, and in Ontario where there are only two remaining populations located within a single stretch of oak savanna near Burlington. There is currently a recovery strategy in place organized by the Ontario Ministry of Natural Resources to monitor these last populations.

Description
The stems are covered with a soft, whitish down. A vigorous and often aggressive grower, this plant spreads by long rhizomes.

White blooms appear from July to September.  Pycnanthemum means "dense flower-clusters" in Greek, and the flowers are favored by butterflies, moths, honeybees, and some species of wasps.

Varieties
There are two varieties: 
 Pycnanthemum incanum var. incanum - Ontario, eastern US
 Pycnanthemum incanum var. puberulum (E.Grant & Epling) Fernald - West Virginia, Alabama, North + South Carolina

Uses
When crushed, the leaves emit a strong minty aroma, and are often used to flavor teas.

Medicinal use
This species contains tannin and is considered to be an astringent.

The Choctaw put the mashed leaves in warm water, which the patient drank, and which was poured over the head to relieve headaches.  For patients who were sickly all the time, the leaves were mashed in water, the doctor took a mouthful of water, and blew it onto the patient, three times on the head, three times on the back, and three times on the chest.  Before the next sunrise, the patient was bathed in the medicine.

The Koasati mashed the leaves in water, and used the water to treat laziness.  The patient bathed his face in the cold water and drank it.  For nosebleeds, the plant was wetted, and put up into the nostrils to stop the bleed.  The roots were boiled along with Black Willow, and drunk to relieve headache.

It is considered to be a food source for large mammals, as well.

References

Bibliography
  Native American Ethnobotany Database: Pycnanthemum incanum (Hoary Mountainmint)
 Endangered Species Act of 1990, Ontario, Canada
 Darlington, William "Flora Cestrica", published by Lindsay and Blakiston, 1853
 Wood, Alphonso "A Class-book of Botany", published by Manufactering Co., 1851
 Gray, Asa "Gray's School and Field Book of Botany, published by Ivison, Blakeman, Taylor, & Company, 1879
 Elliot, William "The Washington Guide", published by F. Taylor, 1837
 Taylor, Lyda Averill "Plants Used As Curatives by Certain Southeastern Tribes", published by Botanical Museum of Harvard University, Cambridge, MA, 1940
 Mnr.gov.on.ca: Ontario Endangered species - Pycnanthemum incanum
  Rom.on.ca/ontario/risk: Pycnanthemum incanum

External links
 USDA Plants Profile for Pycnanthemum incanum (hoary mountainmint)
  Lady Bird Johnson Wildflower Center Native Plant Information Network-NPIN: Pycnanthemum incanum (Hoary mountain mint, Silverleaf mountain mint)

incanum
Flora of the Northeastern United States
Flora of the Southeastern United States
Flora of Ontario
Flora of the Appalachian Mountains
Flora of the Great Lakes region (North America)
Medicinal plants of North America
Plants used in traditional Native American medicine
Plants described in 1753
Taxa named by Carl Linnaeus
Endangered flora of the United States
Endangered flora of North America
Flora without expected TNC conservation status